Ayoub Pourtaghi Ghoushchi (1 January 1973 – 29 September 2021) was an amateur boxer from Iran, who competed in the 1996 Summer Olympics in the Light heavyweight (81 kg) division and lost in the first round to Jean-Louis Mandengue of France. He also participated at the 1994 Asian Games and won the gold medal.

References

External links
 

1973 births
2021 deaths
Iranian male boxers
Olympic boxers of Iran
Boxers at the 1996 Summer Olympics
Asian Games gold medalists for Iran
Asian Games medalists in boxing
Boxers at the 1994 Asian Games
Medalists at the 1994 Asian Games
Light-heavyweight boxers
People from Urmia
20th-century Iranian people
21st-century Iranian people